Steven Edward Sherlock is an English former professional footballer who played as a full-back, making over 300 career appearances.

Career
Sherlock played for Manchester City, Luton Town, Stockport County, Cardiff City, and Newport County, before playing non-league football for Stroud.

References

1950s births
Living people
English footballers
Manchester City F.C. players
Luton Town F.C. players
Stockport County F.C. players
Cardiff City F.C. players
Newport County A.F.C. players
Forest Green Rovers F.C. players
English Football League players
Association football fullbacks
Footballers from Birmingham, West Midlands